Lucas Brothers was a leading British building business based in London.

Early history
The business was founded by Charles Thomas Lucas (1820 London – 1895 Warnham Court, near Horsham) and Thomas Lucas (1822–1902). They were the sons of James Lucas (1792–1865), a builder from St Pancras, London. Charles joined his father's business and was soon employed to manage construction of the Norwich & Brandon Railway for Sir Samuel Morton Peto.

In 1842 Charles set up his own contracting business in Norwich and progressed to rebuilding Peto's house, Somerleyton Hall. Charles and Thomas established a facility in Lowestoft from which they undertook various works, including the railway, the station, the Esplanade, Wellington Terrace, Kirkley Cliff Terrace, St John's church, and several hotels.

Building contracts 
Building contracts included:
Covent Garden Opera House (completed in 1858)
Oxford University Museum of Natural History (1860)
Floral Hall (1860)
King's College Hospital (1862)
Langham Hotel (1865)
Charing Cross Hotel (1865)
the Junior Carlton Club (1866)
City Terminus Hotel (1867)
Royal Albert Hall (1871)
Charterhouse School (1872)
Alexandra Palace (1873)
Royal Station Hotel, York (1878)
Great Eastern Hotel (1884)

Stations included:
Lowestoft railway station (1855)
Charing Cross railway station (1864)
Cannon Street station (1866)
Liverpool Street station (1874)
York railway station (1877)

Private houses included:
Cliveden (1851)
Henham Hall (1858)
Rendlesham Hall (1870)
Normanhurst Court (1870)

Civil engineering works i.e. railways and bridges were undertaken from 1870 by the joint venture, Lucas and Aird.

Lucas Brothers also undertook the construction for the International Exhibition of 1862 and the South Kensington Exhibitions of 1867 and 1871 with Sir John Kelk.

Structure
After the company began collaborating with John Aird & Co., their combined businesses were re-organised in 1870 as follows:
 Lucas Brothers – Building
 Lucas and Aird – Railway work and civil engineering
 John Aird & Sons – Water and gas contracts

In 1895, when Sir Charles Lucas died, Lucas Brothers and Lucas and Aird were dissolved.

About the founders

Charles Thomas Lucas married Charlotte Tiffin and had five sons and two daughters. He lived in London and then at Warnham in Sussex. He was created a Baronet in 1887. Thomas Lucas married Jane Golder and had a daughter. After her death, he married Mary Amelia Chamberlin, daughter of Robert Chamberlin of Norwich, and had six sons and four daughters. He lived in London, Ascot, and briefly at Ashtead in Surrey.

Sir Thomas Charles Lucas was the first of the Lucas baronets, the present holder of the baronetcy is Sir Thomas Edward Gubbins Lucas 5th Bt.

References

Further reading
The Master Builders by Robert Keith Middlemas, Hutchinson, 1963, ASIN B0000CLXYL
Sir Samuel Morton Peto by Rev Dr Edward C Brooks, Brookes, 1996, 
Deptford, Toronto and Kingston by Peter Stirling-Aird, Grimsay Press, 2005, 

Lucas Brothers
Lucas Brothers
Construction and civil engineering companies established in 1842
Alexandra Palace
British companies established in 1842
British companies disestablished in 1895
1842 establishments in England
1895 disestablishments in England
Construction and civil engineering companies disestablished in the 19th century